Jebel Yagour is a mountain in the High Atlas range of Morocco, located to the south of Marrakesh. It is a between 2300 and 2700 m high plateau surrounded by massive escarpments. 

The mountain is noted for its rock art and for its panoramic views of the Atlas range.  There are over thousand engraved images on the rocks dating back to 500 - 1000 BC.

References

External links
Djebel Yagour, Setti-Fatma
Hiking in Toubkal massif, Morocco

Mountains of Morocco
Atlas Mountains